Alexandre Gingras is a Canadian racing driver. He competes in the PASS North Series. He previously competed in the Quebec ACT Series.

Champion of the Quebec ACT Series in 2008, he won four races in the Quebec ACT Series and one in the US-based ACT Tour.

He finished fourth in the PASS North championship in 2011.

External links
Alexandre Gingras on thethirdturn.com
Alexandre Gingras on Stock Car Quebec

Racing drivers from Quebec
Living people
Sportspeople from Quebec
1974 births